Anthea Christine Millett, CBE, FRGS, FRSA (2 November 1941 – 5 December 2022) was a British educator who held a number of appointments and posts in the public sector, including Chairman of the Avon, Gloucestershire and Wiltshire Strategic Health Authority (2002–2006).

Teaching career
A graduate of the University of London, Millett began her teaching career in London, moving from there to Birmingham, Solihull and Coventry, where she was deputy head of a large comprehensive school.

Career with HM Inspectorate
In 1978, she entered HM Inspectorate, and in 1984 became Staff Inspector for assessment and examinations. In 1978, she became Chief Inspector with responsibility for Special Educational Needs (SEN), educational disadvantage and inner cities, inspection policy and Schools 11-16. She became Director of Inspection at Ofsted in August 1992. From January 1995 until December 1999, she was Chief Executive of the Teacher Training Agency (TTA).

Voluntary work
Millett's voluntary contributions included: 
 Vice Presidency/Education – Royal Geographical Society
 Governorship – The Commonwealth Institute
 Chief Executive – Governing Body of the Francis Holland (Church of England) Schools Trust
 Director – The Dyslexia Institute

Personal life and death
Millett died in Sidmouth, Devon on 5 December 2022, at the age of 81.

Honours
Millett was awarded:
 CBE "for services to teacher training" in 2000
 Fellow and former Vice President (Education) of the Royal Geographical Society (FRGS)
 Fellow of the Royal Society of Arts (FRSA)
 Member of Council of the Commonwealth Institute.

References

External links
 BBC article
 AGWSHA (currently available only through )

1941 births
2022 deaths
British educational theorists
Schoolteachers from London
Commanders of the Order of the British Empire
Fellows of the Royal Geographical Society
Alumni of the University of London
Place of birth missing
Schoolteachers from the West Midlands